Hummingbird Ltd. (previously NASDAQ: HUMC, TSX: HUM) is a subsidiary of OpenText and is a provider of enterprise software solutions including Exceed.  Initially founded as a consulting business in 1984, Hummingbird moved into the connectivity market. Its enterprise content management (ECM) solutions focuses on the management of the life cycle of enterprise content.

Hummingbird has 40 offices worldwide. Customers include IBM, NASA, Morgan Stanley, Boeing, The Walt Disney Company, and The Government of Canada.

History

Hummingbird was one of many vendors of X server and Unix connectivity solutions for Windows-based computers, with its eXceed product being regarded as "an excellent all-round product" in the form of eXceed/W at version 3.3.3 in one 1994 review. The product provided an X server alongside other traditional TCP/IP-based applications such as FTP and telnet clients, supporting the wide range of TCP/IP stacks available for Windows at that time, requiring a minimum system specification of Windows 3.0 running on an Intel 80286-based PC with 2 MB of RAM. Version 4.0 of eXceed became available in 1994, and was released for Windows NT in 1995. A survey of the PC X server market by International Data Corporation for 1993 portrayed Hummingbird as the market leader with a reported 32% market share.

Acquisition of PCDOCS was one of the most important steps of the company in the way of formation as an ECM-oriented company. DOCS Open product of PCDOCS Inc. became Hummingbird DOCSFusion and DM - a part of Hummingbird document management system (a part of Hummingbird Enterprise Suite). The product still exists in Open Text products after rebranding with new name as eDOCS DM. In November 2012 OpenText launched the new v5.3.1 version with full support of Windows 8 and Windows Server 2012.

Mergers, Acquisitions, IPOs 
 1984 - Hummingbird founded.
 1993 - Completes $45 million CAD IPO of common shares in Canada, on the Toronto Stock Exchange.
 1994 - Completes US$34.5 million additional and secondary offering of common shares on NASDAQ.
 1995 - Acquires Beame & Whiteside Software Inc., developer of NFS products.
 1996 - Purchased naming rights to the O'Keefe Centre, now known as Meridian Hall.
 1997 - Acquires TN3270 and TN5250 terminal emulation software from McGill University and PolarSoft Inc. in Canada.
 1998
 Acquires business intelligence solutions vendor, Andyne Computing Ltd.
 Acquires Datenrevision of Hamburg, Germany, a software consulting and distribution company.
 1999
 Acquires Leonard's Logics SA, of Paris, France, makers of Genio, a data transformation and exchange tool (ETL) for deployment of data marts.
 Acquires PC DOCS Group International
 2000 - Ventured into India, by tying up with Dess Computers as its systems integrator for Hummingbird products in India.
 2000 - Acquires imaging technology from Diamond Head Software Inc.
 2001 - Acquires UK company, PeopleDoc.
 2003
 Acquires legal practice management firms LegalKEY Technologies and Kramer Lee & Associates.
 Acquires Valid Information Systems.
 Acquires Key Automation Nederland B.V. and its affiliate Dispro B.V., distributors and integrators of document management solutions in the Netherlands and Benelux.
 2005 - Hummingbird acquires RedDot Solutions, rounding out its integrated ECM offering.
 2006 - Hummingbird acquired by Open Text for $489 million. Hummingbird informed Texas Guaranteed Student Loan Company that it had lost a piece of equipment—albeit password protected—containing the unencrypted personal data (names and social security numbers) of an estimated 1.3 million Texas student loan recipients. The company's board of directors agreed to be sold to Symphony Technology Group, but following a hostile bid from Open Text, the board negotiated a deal with its rival and accepted an all-cash US$489 million buy-out from Open Text.  Following the close of the deal in October, Open Text announced a 15% global workforce reduction.
 2008 - Gold Coast City Council rolls Hummingbird out as document management system to 3000+ employees

Products 
 1990 - Hummingbird Basic and Hummingbird QuickScript
 1994 - Host Explorer

References

External links
 Official website
 Article about the sale of terminal emulator by McGill

Defunct software companies of Canada
Software companies established in 1984
Canadian companies established in 1984
Software companies disestablished in 2006
1984 establishments in Ontario
2006 disestablishments in Ontario
2006 mergers and acquisitions
Defunct companies of Ontario